8-OH-DPAT is a research chemical of the aminotetralin chemical class which was developed in the 1980s and has been widely used to study the function of the 5-HT1A receptor. It was one of the first major 5-HT1A receptor full agonists to be discovered.

Originally believed to be selective for the 5-HT1A receptor, 8-OH-DPAT was later found to act as a 5-HT7 receptor agonist and serotonin reuptake inhibitor/releasing agent as well.

In animal studies, 8-OH-DPAT has been shown to possess antidepressant, anxiolytic, serenic, anorectic, antiemetic,  hypothermic, hypotensive, bradycardic, hyperventilative, and analgesic effects.

See also 
 5-OH-DPAT
 7-OH-DPAT
 Bay R 1531
 MDAT
 UH-301

References

External links 
 Yves Aubert, Thesis, Leiden University. (Dec 11, 2012) Sex, aggression and pair-bond: a study on the serotonergic regulation of female sexual function in the marmoset monkey

5-HT1A agonists
5-HT7 agonists
Serotonin reuptake inhibitors
Serotonin releasing agents
Phenols
Aminotetralins